Szentesi VSC 91-esek Rögbi Szakosztály (Szentes Railways Sports Club 91 Rugby Department) is a Hungarian rugby club in Szentes. They currently play in Nemzeti Bajnokság I.

History
The club was founded in 1991.

Honours
 Nemzeti Bajnokság II
 1997, 2000, 2005, 2006, 2010

Current squad

References

External links
  Szentesi VSC 91-esek Rögbi Szakosztály

Hungarian rugby union teams
Rugby clubs established in 1991
1991 establishments in Hungary